This is a list of schools in Warwickshire, England:

State-funded schools

Primary schools 

Abbey CE Infant School, Nuneaton
Abbots Farm Infant School, Rugby
Abbots Farm Junior School, Rugby
Acorns Primary School, Long Compton
All Saints CE Academy, Leek Wootton
All Saints CE Junior School, Warwick
All Saints CE Primary School, Nuneaton
Alveston CE Primary School, Tiddington
Arden Forest Infant School, Bulkington
Arley Primary School, Arley
Austrey CE Primary School, Austrey
Aylesford School, Warwick
Barford St Peter's CE Primary School, Barford
Bawnmore Community Infant School, Rugby
Bidford-On-Avon CE Primary School, Bidford-on-Avon
Bilton CE Junior School, Rugby
Bilton Infant School, Rugby
Binley Woods Primary School, Binley Woods
Birchwood Primary School, Dordon
Bishop's Itchington Primary School, Bishop's Itchington
Bishop's Tachbrook CE Primary School, Bishop's Tachbrook
Bishopton Primary School, Stratford-upon-Avon
Boughton Leigh Infant School, Rugby
Boughton Leigh Junior School, Rugby
Bournebrook CE Primary School, Fillongley
Brailes CE Primary School, Lower Brailes
Briar Hill Infant School, Whitnash
Bridgetown Primary School, Stratford-upon-Avon
Brookhurst Primary School, Leamington Spa
Brownsover Community Infant School, Rugby
Budbrooke Primary School, Hampton Magna
Burton Green CE Academy, Burton Green
Camp Hill Primary School, Nuneaton
The Canons CE Primary School, Bedworth
Cawston Grange Primary School, Rugby
Chetwynd Junior School, Nuneaton
Chilvers Coton Community Infant School, Nuneaton
Clapham Terrace Community Primary School, Leamington Spa
Claverdon Primary School, Claverdon
Clifton-upon-Dunsmore CE Primary School, Clifton upon Dunsmore
Clinton Primary School, Kenilworth
Coleshill CE Primary School, Coleshill
Coten End Primary School, Warwick
Coughton CE Primary School, Coughton, Alcester
Croft Junior School, Nuneaton
Cubbington CE Primary School, Cubbington
Curdworth Primary School, Curdworth
The Dassett CE Primary School, Fenny Compton
Dordon Primary School, Dordon
Dunchurch Boughton CE Junior School, Dunchurch
Dunchurch Infant School, Dunchurch
Dunnington CE Primary School, Alcester
Eastlands Primary School, Rugby
Emscote Infant School, Warwick
English Martyrs RC Primary School, Rugby
Ettington CE Primary School, Ettington
Exhall Cedars Infant School, Ash Green
Exhall Junior School, Exhall
The Ferncumbe CE Primary School, Hatton
Galley Common Infant School, Nuneaton
Glendale Infant School, Nuneaton
Goodyers End Primary School, Bedworth
Great Alne Primary School, Great Alne
Hampton Lucy CE Primary School, Hampton Lucy
Harbury CE Primary School, Harbury
Heathcote Primary School, Heathcote
Henley-In-Arden CE Primary School, Henley-in-Arden
Henry Hinde Infant School, Rugby
Henry Hinde Junior School, Rugby
High Meadow Community School, Coleshill
Hillmorton Primary School, Rugby
Holy Trinity CE Primary School, Stratford-upon-Avon
Hurley Primary School, Hurley
Ilmington CE Primary School, Ilmington
Keresley Newland Primary Academy, Keresley End
Kineton CE Primary School, Kineton
Kingsway Community Primary School, Leamington Spa
Kingsbury Primary School, Kingsbury
Kingsway Community Primary School, Leamington Spa
Knightlow CE Primary School, Stretton-on-Dunsmore
Lapworth CE Primary School, Lapworth
Leamington Hastings CE Academy, Leamington Hastings
Lighthorne Heath Primary School, Lighthorne Heath
Lillington Primary School, Leamington Spa
Long Itchington CE Academy, Long Itchington
Long Lawford Primary School, Long Lawford
Lower Farm Academy, Nuneaton
Loxley CE Community Primary School, Loxley
Mappleborough Green CE Primary School, Mappleborough Green
Michael Drayton Junior School, Nuneaton
Middlemarch School, Nuneaton
Milby Primary School, Nuneaton
Milverton Primary School, Leamington Spa
Moreton Morrell CE Primary School, Moreton Morrell
Nathaniel Newton Infant School, Nuneaton
The Nethersole CE Academy, Polesworth
Newbold and Tredington CE Primary School, Tredington
Newburgh Primary School, Warwick
Newdigate Primary School, Bedworth
Newton Regis CE Primary School, Newton Regis
Northlands Primary School, Rugby
Nursery Hill Primary School, Nuneaton
Oakfield Primary Academy, Rugby
Oakley School, Leamington Spa
Our Lady & St Joseph RC Academy, Nuneaton
Our Lady & St Teresa's RC Primary School, Cubbington
Our Lady's RC Primary School, Alcester
Our Lady's RC Primary School, Princethorpe
Outwoods Primary School, Atherstone
Paddox Primary School, Rugby
Park Hill Junior School, Kenilworth
Park Lane Primary School, Nuneaton
Priors Field Primary School, Kenilworth
The Priors School, Priors Marston
Provost Williams CE Primary School, Ryton-on-Dunsmore
Queen's CE Academy, Nuneaton
Quinton Primary School, Lower Quinton
Race Leys Infant School, Bedworth
Race Leys Junior School, Bedworth
Racemeadow Primary Academy, Atherstone
Radford Semele CE Primary School, Radford Semele
The Revel CE Primary School, Monks Kirby
Riverside Academy, Rugby
Rokeby Primary School, Rugby
Rugby Free Primary School, Rugby
St Andrew's Benn CE Primary School, Rugby
St Anne's RC Academy, Nuneaton
St Anthony's RC Primary School, Leamington Spa
St Augustine's RC Primary School, Kenilworth
St Benedict's RC Primary Academy, Atherstone
St Edward's RC Primary School, Coleshill
St Francis RC Academy, Bedworth
St Gabriel's CE Academy, Rugby
St Gregory's RC Primary School, Stratford-upon-Avon
St James' CE Academy, Bulkington
St John's Primary School, Kenilworth
St Joseph's RC Primary School, Whitnash
St Lawrence CE Primary School, Napton-on-the-Hill
St Margaret's CE Junior School, Whitnash
St Marie's RC Primary School, Rugby
St Mary Immaculate RC Primary School, Warwick
St Mary's RC Primary School, Henley-in-Arden
St Mary's RC Primary School, Southam
St Mary's RC Primary School, Studley
St Matthew's Bloxham CE Primary School, Rugby
St Michael's CE Academy, Bedworth
St Nicholas CE Primary, Alcester
St Nicholas CE Primary School, Kenilworth
St Nicolas CE Academy, Nuneaton
St Oswald's CE Academy, Rugby
St Patrick's RC Primary School, Leamington Spa
St Paul's CE Primary School, Leamington Spa
St Paul's CE Primary School, Nuneaton
St Peter's RC Primary School, Leamington Spa
Salford Priors CE Academy, Salford Priors
Shipston Primary School, Shipston-on-Stour
Shottery St Andrew's CE Primary School, Shottery
Shrubland Street Community Primary School, Leamington Spa
Shustoke CE Primary School, Shustoke
Snitterfield Primary School, Snitterfield
Southam Primary School, Southam
Southam St James CE Academy, Southam
Stockingford Academy, Nuneaton
Stockton Primary School, Stockton
Stratford-upon-Avon Primary School, Stratford-upon-Avon
Studley Infants' School, Studley
Studley St Mary's CE Academy, Studley
Sydenham Primary School, Leamington Spa
Tanworth-in-Arden CE Primary School, Tanworth-in-Arden
Telford Infant School, Leamington Spa
Telford Junior School, Leamington Spa
Temple Grafton CE Primary School, Temple Grafton
Temple Herdewyke Primary School, Temple Herdewyke
Thomas Jolyffe Primary School, Stratford-upon-Avon
Thorns Community Infant School, Kenilworth
Tudor Grange Primary Academy Haselor, Haselor
Tudor Grange Primary Academy Meon Vale, Stratford-upon-Avon
Tysoe CE Primary School, Tysoe
Warton Nethersole's CE Primary School, Warton
Water Orton Primary School, Water Orton
Weddington Primary School, Nuneaton
Welford-on-Avon Primary School, Welford-on-Avon
Wellesbourne CE Primary School, Wellesbourne
Wembrook Primary School, Nuneaton
Westgate Primary School, Warwick
Wheelwright Lane Primary School, Ash Green
Whitestone Infant School, Nuneaton
Whitnash Primary School, Leamington Spa
Wilmcote CE Primary School, Wilmcote
Wolston St Margaret's CE Primary School, Wolston
Wolverton Primary School, Norton Lindsey
Wolvey CE Primary School, Wolvey
Wood End Primary School, Wood End
Woodloes Primary School, Warwick
Woodside CE Primary School, Grendon
Wootton Wawen CE Primary School, Wootton Wawen

Non-selective secondary schools

Alcester Academy, Alcester
Ash Green School, Exhall
Ashlawn School, Rugby (Bi-lateral)
Avon Valley School, Rugby
Aylesford School, Warwick
Bilton School, Rugby
Campion School, Leamington Spa
The Coleshill School, Coleshill
Etone College, Nuneaton
George Eliot Academy, Nuneaton
Harris Church of England Academy, Rugby
Hartshill Academy, Hartshill
Henley-in-Arden School, Henley-in-Arden
Higham Lane School, Nuneaton
Houlton School, Rugby
Kenilworth School and Sixth Form, Kenilworth
Kineton High School, Kineton
Kingsbury School, Kingsbury
Myton School, Warwick
Nicholas Chamberlaine School, Bedworth
North Leamington School, Leamington Spa
Nuneaton Academy, Nuneaton
Oakley School, Leamington Spa
The Polesworth School, Polesworth
The Queen Elizabeth Academy, Atherstone
Rugby Free Secondary School, Rugby
St Benedict's Catholic High School, Alcester
St Thomas More Catholic School, Nuneaton
Shipston High School, Shipston-on-Stour
Southam College, Southam
Stratford-upon-Avon School, Stratford-upon-Avon 
Studley High School, Studley
Trinity Catholic School, Leamington Spa

Grammar schools
Alcester Grammar School, Alcester
King Edward VI School, Stratford-upon-Avon 
Lawrence Sheriff School, Rugby
Rugby High School for Girls, Rugby
Stratford Girls' Grammar School, Stratford-upon-Avon

Special and alternative schools

Avon Park School, Rugby
Brooke School, Rugby
Corley Academy, Corley*
Discovery Academy, Nuneaton
Evergreen School, Warwick
Exhall Grange School, Exhall
Oak Wood Primary School, Nuneaton
Oak Wood Secondary School, Nuneaton
Quest Academy, Rugby
Venture Academy, Henley-in-Arden
Welcombe Hills School, Stratford-upon-Avon
The Warwickshire Academy, Coventry**
Woodlands, Coleshill

*This school is located in Warwickshire, but is for pupils from Coventry**This school is located in Coventry, but is for pupils from Warwickshire

Further education 
King Edward VI College
North Warwickshire and Hinckley College
Stratford-upon-Avon College
Warwickshire College

Independent schools

Primary and preparatory schools
Bilton Grange, Dunchurch
Crackley Hall School, Kenilworth
Crescent School, Rugby
The Croft Preparatory School, Stratford-upon-Avon
Henley-in-Arden Montessori School, Henley-in-Arden
Stratford Preparatory School, Stratford-upon-Avon
Warwick Preparatory School, Warwick

Senior and all-through schools
Arnold Lodge School, Leamington Spa
The King's High School for Girls, Warwick
The Kingsley School, Leamington Spa
OneSchool Global UK, Atherstone
Princethorpe College, Princethorpe
Rugby School, Rugby
Warwick School, Warwick

Special and alternative schools

ALP Nuneaton, Nuneaton
Arc School Ansley, Ansley
Arc School Napton, Napton on the Hill
Arc School Old Arley, Old Arley
Avon Park School, Rugby
Brickyard Barn Outdoor Learning Centre, Bishop's Tachbrook
Emscote School, Warwick
The Haven School, Wolston
Mill House School, Kingsbury
Northleigh House School, Hatton
The Secret Garden, Shustoke
Values Academy, Nuneaton
VLC, Leamington Spa
Wathen Grange School, Mancetter

Warwickshire
Schools in Warwickshire